David Weston (30 July 1930 – 25 January 1977) was a New Zealand cricketer. He played one first-class match for Auckland in 1950/51.

See also
 List of Auckland representative cricketers

References

External links
 

1930 births
1977 deaths
New Zealand cricketers
Auckland cricketers
Cricketers from Whangārei